State Route 243 (SR 243), or the Banning-Idyllwild Panoramic Highway, is a 30-mile (50 kilometer) two-lane state highway in the U.S. state of California that runs from Banning (in the north) to Idyllwild (in the south) in Riverside County. The highway is a connector between Interstate 10 (I-10) and SR 74. Along its route, it provides access to the  San Bernardino National Forest. A road from Banning to Idyllwild was planned around the turn of the twentieth century, and was open by 1910. The road was added to the state highway system in 1970.

Route description

SR 243 begins at SR 74 in the San Jacinto Wilderness near Mountain Center, Riverside County as Idyllwild Road. The highway traverses north along a winding road through the community of Idyllwild. SR 243 makes a left turn at the intersection with Circle Drive and continues through Pine Cove. The road continues through the forest past Mount San Jacinto State Park through Twin Pines and the Morongo Indian Reservation before making a few switchbacks and descending en route to the city of Banning as the Banning Idyllwild Panoramic Highway. The highway continues as San Gorgonio Avenue into the city before making a left onto Lincoln Street and a right onto 8th Street and terminating at a diamond interchange with I-10.

Except for a portion in Banning SR 243 is not part of the National Highway System, a network of highways that are considered essential to the country's economy, defense, and mobility by the Federal Highway Administration. SR 243 is eligible for the State Scenic Highway System, and is officially designated as a scenic highway by the California Department of Transportation (Caltrans), meaning that it is a substantial section of highway passing through a "memorable landscape" with no "visual intrusions", where the potential designation has gained popular favor with the community. In 2007, it was named the Esperanza Firefighters Memorial Highway in honor of five firefighters who died while fighting the Esperanza Fire in October 2006. In 2013, SR 243 had an annual average daily traffic (AADT) of 1,650 between Marion Ridge Drive in Idyllwild and San Gorgonio Avenue in Banning, and 6,500 at the northern terminus in Banning, the latter of which was the highest AADT for the highway.

History
Another  were commissioned in 1908. The oiled road was completed by September 1910, and provided a view of Lake Elsinore and the Colorado Desert, and it was expected to help with transporting lumber and stopping fires; because of this, the federal government provided $2,000 for the construction. The road became a part of the forest highway system in 1927.

A new "high-gear" road from Banning to Idyllwild was under way by 1935, and two years later, the Los Angeles Times considered the road to be "high-gear". Efforts to pave the road were under way in 1950. The road from Banning through Idyllwild to SR 74 was known as County Route R1 (CR R1) by 1966. By 1969, plans were in place to add the Banning to Idyllwild to Mountain Center road as a state highway; earlier, State Senator Nelson S. Dilworth proposed legislation to require the road to be added to the state highway system if SR 195 was removed, as the two were of roughly the same length, but the latter remained in the system. SR 243 was added to the state highway system in 1970. The Division of Highways suggested deleting the highway in 1971. In 1998, Caltrans had no plans to improve the route through 2015.

On February 14, 2019, heavy rain caused severe damage to the highway, causing it to close for several months. It has since reopened.

Major intersections

See also

References

External links

California @ AARoads.com - State Route 243
Caltrans: Route 243 highway conditions
California Highways: SR 243

243
State Route 243
243
Banning, California